Adirim is a small moshav in northern Israel. Located adjacent to Barak and Dvora and six kilometres south of Afula, it falls under the jurisdiction of Gilboa Regional Council.

Etymology
Adirim derives its name from the Bible;  "Water he requested, (but) milk she gave him: in a lordly bowl she brought him cream." Adirim is also mentioned in : "Then down marched the remnant of the nobles." It commemorates the warriors of the nearby battle, led by the Biblical Deborah, as well as the Israeli soldiers who fought nearby in the War of Independence.

History
The moshav founded on 20 February 1956 by immigrants from Morocco, the first of the Gush Hever moshavim. Its proximity to the Green Line made it a target for terrorist infiltrators in its early years.

References

Moshavim
Populated places established in 1956
1956 establishments in Israel
Populated places in Northern District (Israel)
Moroccan-Jewish culture in Israel